Raw Like Sushi is the debut studio album by Swedish musician Neneh Cherry, released 5 June 1989 by Virgin Records. The album includes the commercially successful single "Buffalo Stance".

Background 
An early version of "Buffalo Stance" appeared on the B-side of the 1986 Stock Aitken Waterman-produced Morgan-McVey single, "Looking Good Diving", titled "Looking Good Diving with the Wild Bunch". The single was not successful; however, the B-side was re-recorded with Tim Simenon of Bomb the Bass, and became the version of "Buffalo Stance" that was a worldwide hit, reaching #3 in the UK Singles Chart, #3 on the Billboard Hot 100 and #1 in the Netherlands and Sweden. The album also contains the #8 US (and #20 UK) hit "Kisses on the Wind", and the #5 UK hit "Manchild".

All musicians and programmers are credited in the album sleeve, however Cameron McVey, Cherry's husband, is credited as "Booga Bear". Massive Attack's Robert Del Naja co-wrote "Manchild", and fellow member Andrew Vowles aka DJ Mushroom performs on "Kisses on the Wind", "The Next Generation" and "So Here I Come". "My Bitch" is a vocal duet with Gilly G.

The cover and inner photos were shot by fashion photographer Jean-Baptiste Mondino.

Music 
Raw Like Sushi is distinctive for its eclectic mix of genres, incorporating influences from across the trends of 1980s pop music. Cherry sings and raps accompanied by a diverse set of sounds, including pianos, synthesizers, brass instruments, guitars, and go-go percussion. The album's lyrical themes are influenced by Cherry's experiences of motherhood, and her education and upbringing.

When it was released, the album was favorably compared to Madonna and Prince, though it did not reach similar popularity.

Reception 

NME critic David Quantick praised Raw Like Sushi as "the sort of record you can rarely buy – immediate, commercial pop that only someone with a rather individual worldview could have made", highlighting its unconventional song structures and Cherry's "wit, intelligence and even maturity." Selina Webb of British music newspaper Music Week called it "eclectic, wholesome, a subtly teasing collection of provoking yet pouting songs", "a confident manifesto from refreshing new pop diva." Pete Clark of Hi-Fi News & Record Review said that Cherry's music "is illuminated by a jazzy delight in non-conformity" and singled out "effortlessly memorable" "Buffalo Stance" and "Manchild". As per Chris Murray of RPM "this package contains something for any contemporary dance music fan."

Raw Like Sushi was included in the book 1001 Albums You Must Hear Before You Die.

Track listing 

Note
 Tracks 1–10 were on the original LP. In the United Kingdom, tracks 11–14 were on the CD release while tracks 13 and 14 were on the tape cassette album.

Personnel 
Neneh Cherry – lead vocals, programming
Sandy McLelland – backing vocals on "Inna City Mamma", "Love Ghetto" and "Phoney Ladies"
Chandra Armstead – backing vocals on "Outré Risqué Locomotive" 
Eagle-Eye Cherry – toasting on "Heart"
Sarah Erde – Hispanic vocals on "Kisses on the Wind"
Cameron "Booga Bear" McVey – backing vocals, executive producer, mixing, beats on "Manchild"
Phil Chill – programming, beats, backing vocals on "The Next Generation"
Claudia Fontaine – backing vocals on "Kisses on the Wind"
Nellee Hooper – vibraphone
Jerod Minnies – guitar on "Love Ghetto"
Alvin Moody – beats and programming on "Outré Risqué Locomotive"
Nick Plytas – programming
Jeff Scantlebury – congas on "Kisses on the Wind"
John Sharp – programming on "Manchild"
Tim Simenon – beats and turntables on "Buffalo Stance" and "Heart"
Dynamik Duo – beats
Mark Saunders – multi-instruments, beats on "Buffalo Stance"
Wil Malone – conductor, programming, string arrangements on "Manchild", backing vocals
Gordon Dukes – backing vocals on "Outré Risqué Locomotive"
Mushroom – programming, turntables on "Kisses on the Wind", "The Next Generation" and "So Here I Come"
Technical
Jean-Baptiste Mondino – photography

Charts

Weekly charts

Year-end charts

Certifications and sales

References

Further reading

External links 
BBC News: Neneh Cherry revisits Raw Like Sushi track by track

1989 debut albums
Albums produced by Cameron McVey
Albums produced by Mark Saunders (record producer)
Albums produced by Tim Simenon
Neneh Cherry albums
Virgin Records albums